Democratic Italy (Italia Democratica, ID) was a political party in Italy led by Nando Dalla Chiesa.

History
The party was founded by Nando Dalla Chiesa and Claudio Fava on 1 December 1994, after leaving The Network in the previous months.

For the general elections of 1996 ID presented its candidates on the lists of the Federation of the Greens, obtaining the election as deputy  of the coordinator Nando Dalla Chiesa.

On 26 October 1997 he took part in the first elections of the so-called Padanian Parliament in an anti-secessionist key with the "Citizens of the North for a Democratic Italy" list.

In January 1999 Democratic Italy federated with the Greens and Dalla Chiesa was candidate on the green list in the 1999 European election. Subsequently, in 2000, Dalla Chiesa joined The Democrats of Arturo Parisi.

References

1994 establishments in Italy
2000 disestablishments in Italy
Defunct political parties in Italy
Political parties established in 1994
Political parties disestablished in 2000